Baryssinus bicirrifer is a species of longhorn beetle in the family Cerambycidae. It was described by Bates in 1872.

References

Baryssinus
Beetles described in 1872